Luca Meazza (born 12 November 1965 in Milan) is an Italian retired footballer. He played as a central defender. He played for Inter youth teams and made his debut in Serie A with the nerazzurri on 15 April 1984 against Avellino. He was then loaned to Taranto and Cesena in Serie B. He continued his career in the lower divisions for a few years.

Career
1983-1984  Inter 1 (0)
1984-1985 →  Taranto 14 (0)
1985  Inter 0 (0)
1985-1986 →  Cesena 13 (0)
1986-1989  Alessandria 57 (0)
1990-1991  Sant'Angelo 8 (0)

References

1965 births
Living people
Italian footballers
Serie A players
Serie B players
Inter Milan players
Taranto F.C. 1927 players

Association football defenders